Santoni is the surname of:

Dante Santoni (born 1960), member of the Pennsylvania House of Representatives
Elisa Santoni (born 1987), Italian rhythmic gymnast
Félix Santoni, Puerto Rican politician and senator (1917-1920)
François Santoni, suspected of being one of the leaders of Armata Corsa, a defunct separatist terrorist organization in Corsica
Joël Santoni (born 1943), French film director and screenwriter
Michael Santoni, Jr. (born 1964), professional wrestler under the ring name Big Guido
Nicola Santoni (born 1979), Italian former football goalkeeper
Reni Santoni (born 1939), American film, television and voice actor